US Post Office—Angola is a historic post office building located at Angola in Erie County, New York. It was designed and built 1938–1939, and is one of a number of post offices in New York State designed by the Office of the Supervising Architect of the Treasury Department, Louis A. Simon.  The building is in the Colonial Revival style.  The interior features a cast-stone relief sculpture by Leopold Scholz executed in 1940 and titled A Pioneer Woman's Bravery.

It was listed on the National Register of Historic Places in 1989.

References

External links
Western New York Heritage Press: Angola Post Office Art photos

Angola
Government buildings completed in 1939
Colonial Revival architecture in New York (state)
Angola
National Register of Historic Places in Erie County, New York